McDonald Lake is a lake of Richmond County, in north-eastern Nova Scotia, Canada.

See also
List of lakes in Nova Scotia

References
 National Resources Canada

Lakes of Nova Scotia